Eshleman is a surname. It is an anglicized form of the Swiss German surname Aeschlimann. Notable people with the surname include:

Clayton Eshleman (born 1935), American poet, translator, and editor
Edwin Duing Eshleman (1920–1985), American politician who represented Pennsylvania in the US House of Representatives
John Morton Eshleman (1876–1916), American lawyer and California politician, Californian lieutenant governor 1915–1916